Abhishek Bachchan (born 5 February 1976) is an Indian actor and film producer known for his work in Hindi films. Part of the Bachchan family, he is the son of actors Amitabh Bachchan and Jaya Bachchan and the grandson of poet Harivansh Rai Bachchan and social activist Teji Bachchan.

Bachchan debuted with the war film Refugee (2000), followed by a dozen of unsuccessful ventures. His career prospects changed with the successful action film Dhoom (2004) and critical acclaim proved with three consecutive Filmfare Award for Best Supporting Actor for his performance in the dramas Yuva (2004), Sarkar (2005), and Kabhi Alvida Naa Kehna (2006), making him the only actor after Dilip Kumar to win 3 consecutive Filmfare Awards. His biggest solo critical and commercial success came with a character loosely based on Dhirubhai Ambani in Guru (2007).

Bachchan has starred in the successful films Dhoom (2004), Bunty Aur Babli (2005), Dus (2005), Bluffmaster! (2005), Sarkar (2005), Kabhi Alvida Naa Kehna (2006), Dhoom 2 (2006), Guru (2007), Dostana (2008), Paa (2009), Bol Bachchan (2012), Dhoom 3 (2013), Happy New Year (2014) and Housefull 3 (2016). He earned renewed critical acclaim for digital ventures like Breathe: Into the Shadows (2020), Ludo (2020) and Dasvi (2022).

In addition to his three Filmfare Awards, Bachchan also scored a hattrick for the Zee Cine Award for Best Actor in a Supporting Role (2005–07), and won a National Film Award for Best Feature Film in Hindi for producing the comedy-drama Paa (2009). Since 2007, he has been married to actress Aishwarya Rai, with whom he has a daughter.

Early life and family 

Abhishek Bachchan was born on 5 February 1976 in Mumbai to veteran actors of Hindi cinema, Amitabh Bachchan and Jaya Bachchan (ńee Bhaduri), an accomplished actress in her own right. He has a sister, Shweta Bachchan. His grandfather, Harivansh Rai Bachchan, was a noted poet of the Nayi Kavita Literary Movement of the Hindi literature and professor at the Allahabad University in Uttar Pradesh, while his grandmother, Teji Bachchan, was a social activist. The original surname of his family is Srivastava, Bachchan being the pen name used by his grandfather. However, when Amitabh entered films, he did so under his father's pen name. Bachchan is of Awadhi and Punjabi heritage on his father's side, and Bengali from his mother's side. His maternal grandfather was Taroon Kumar Bhaduri, a famous author, and poet. TK Bhaduri wrote a famous book Obhishopto Chambol (Cursed Chambal), an account of his experiences as a journalist/writer in the area. This book provided the raw material and inspiration to almost all dacoit-related films made by the Hindi film industry in India.

Abhishek attended Jamnabai Narsee School and Bombay Scottish School in Mumbai, Modern School, Vasant Vihar, New Delhi, and Aiglon College in Switzerland. He then attended Boston University but did not obtain any degree from there and he subsequently moved on to Bollywood. He was diagnosed with dyslexia at the age of 9.

Career

2000–2009: Debut, setback and resurgence 
In 2000, Bachchan made his film debut playing the male lead in J. P. Dutta's war drama Refugee opposite Kareena Kapoor, who was also making her debut in the film. Although the film only performed moderately well at the box office, both Bachchan and Kapoor received positive reviews for their performances. Film critic Taran Adarsh wrote that he "has all it takes to emerge a competent actor in years to come. Even in his debut-making film, Abhishek comes across as a fine actor and lives up to his family name."

Bachchan also shot for a cameo in the 2001 film Kabhi Khushi Kabhie Gham..., a scene which was later edited out of the film.

After Refugee, Bachchan starred in a series of poorly received films that failed to make a mark at the box office. However, his performance in Sooraj R. Barjatya's romantic dramedy Main Prem Ki Diwani Hoon (2003) earned him his first nomination for the Filmfare Award for Best Supporting Actor, although the film was a flop. He also went on to win the award the following year for his performance in Mani Ratnam's political drama Yuva (2004). Hrithik Roshan has since named Abhishek Bachchan one of the finest actors of the 2000s and onwards.

Bachchan better established himself in Hindi cinema playing a no-nonsense Mumbai police officer in the hit action thriller Dhoom (2004), which also starred John Abraham, Uday Chopra, Esha Deol, and Rimi Sen in pivotal roles. His next two films were Phir Milenge (2004) and Naach (2004).

Bachchan's first release of 2005 was the crime comedy Bunty Aur Babli, which featured him and Rani Mukerji as the titular con artist duo who perform several successful heists and fall in love along the way. The film emerged as the second highest-grossing Bollywood film of 2005 and earned him a nomination for the Filmfare Award for Best Actor. This film also marked his first professional collaboration with his father Amitabh Bachchan, who played a police officer closely following the lead pair.

Bachchan was next seen in Ram Gopal Varma's political drama Sarkar, which was a moderate success at the box office. His performance as the morally upright son of a troubled politician (played by his father Amitabh Bachchan) earned him rave reviews from critics as well as his second consecutive Filmfare Award for Best Supporting Actor. His next two releases Dus (2005) and Bluffmaster! (2005) were both moderately successful, but did not earn much critical appreciation.

Bachchan won his third consecutive Filmfare Award for Best Supporting Actor for his performance in Karan Johar's ensemble musical romantic drama Kabhi Alvida Naa Kehna (2006), which became a major blockbuster at the domestic and overseas box office despite dealing with the controversial subject of marital infidelity and dysfunctional relationships. Bachchan played the role of a PR associate whose wife (Rani Mukerji) is unhappy with their marriage, and so begins an affair with a friend (Shah Rukh Khan) who is also unhappy with his marriage to his wife (Preity Zinta).

Bachchan then starred opposite Aishwarya Rai in the period romance Umrao Jaan, a remake of the 1981 film of the same name. The film failed to earn the same level of appreciation as the original and was also a commercial failure. He was next seen in Dhoom 2 (2006), which featured him and Uday Chopra reprising their roles from the original Dhoom (2004) joined by new cast members Hrithik Roshan, Aishwarya Rai, and Bipasha Basu. The film emerged as one of the highest-grossing Bollywood film of 2006, but some critics commented that Bachchan was "reduced to a mere supporting player" to his co-star Roshan.

Bachchan earned much critical acclaim for his performance in Mani Ratnam's Guru (2007), loosely based on the life of business magnate Dhirubhai Ambani." The film starred him alongside Aishwarya Rai Bachchan (their first professional collaboration after marriage), R. Madhavan, Mithun Chakraborty, Vidya Balan, and Arya Babbar. The film was a commercial success at the box office. Guru was called the best Hindi film since Lagaan (2001) by the Los Angeles Weekly.

His next release was the dance comedy Jhoom Barabar Jhoom (2007) alongside Preity Zinta, Bobby Deol, and Lara Dutta. The film was declared average by Box Office India and was a moderate success overseas. He was then seen playing a minor role in the female-centric drama Laaga Chunari Mein Daag (2007) as the love interest of the film's lead actress Rani Mukerji.

Bachchan's first release of 2008 was Ram Gopal Varma's Sarkar Raj, which featured him and his father Amitabh Bachchan reprising their roles from Sarkar (2005) while his wife Aishwarya Rai Bachchan entered the cast as a new addition. This film proved to be successful at the box office and earned him a nomination for the Filmfare Award for Best Supporting Actor. His next release was the fantasy adventure film Drona (2008), which was a major failure both critically and commercially.

Bachchan was next seen in Dostana (2008), a romantic comedy about two men (Bachchan and John Abraham) who pretend to be gay in order to be allowed to live with a girl (Priyanka Chopra), but then find that they have both fallen in love with her. The film was a major success at the box office and earned him a nomination for the Filmfare Award for Best Actor.

Bachchan's first release of 2009 was Delhi-6, which received a lukewarm response from critics. Later that year he was seen in the family dramedy Paa, which he also produced. The film's plot centered on a boy (Amitabh Bachchan) with progeria whose parents were played by Abhishek Bachchan and Vidya Balan. For his work as a producer on the film, Bachchan earned the National Film Award for Best Feature Film in Hindi.

2010–present 

Bachchan experienced a brief setback in his career with five films that failed commercially. These films were the thriller Raavan (2010), the social drama Khelein Hum Jee Jaan Sey (2010), action thrillers Game (2011), Dum Maaro Dum (2011) & the heist thriller Players (2012).

Bachchan then played the lead role in Rohit Shetty's comedy Bol Bachchan (2012), which was a major blockbuster at the box office despite receiving mixed reviews from critics. Film critic Anupama Chopra called Bachchan a "good part of the film" and also commented that he "manages to sparkle even in a script that is lazy and determinedly lowbrow". Bachchan received several awards for his role (Including Screen & IIFA).

Bachchan then appeared in Dhoom 3 (2013), reprising his role from the previous two Dhoom films. In this installment of the series, they were joined by Aamir Khan and Katrina Kaif. The film became a major blockbuster, some critics however commented that Bachchan's performance was overshadowed by Khan's. Dhoom 3 currently ranks among the highest-grossing Hindi films of all time.

Bachchan was next seen in Farah Khan's dance comedy Happy New Year, a musical heist film, playing the second lead to Shah Rukh Khan. The film featured an ensemble cast of Shah Rukh Khan, Deepika Padukone, Sonu Sood, Boman Irani, Vivaan Shah and Jackie Shroff. The movie was a major commercial success at the box office. Bachchan was then seen in the 2015 family drama All Is Well. Bachchan's first release of 2016 was the comedy Housefull 3, the third installment of the Housefull film series. The film was a commercial  success at the box office.

In 2018, Bachchan starred in Anurag Kashyap's Manmarziyaan alongside Taapsee Pannu and Vicky Kaushal. Bachchan was praised for his nuanced performance and depth he brought to the character. In 2020, he featured in T-Series and Anurag Basu Productions film titled Ludo, which was released on Netflix.

As of March 2021, he began filming Dasvi, a film produced by Dinesh Vijan's Maddock Films and Jio Studios, alongside Yami Gautam, in February 2021. His film The Big Bull directed by Kookie Gulati and produced by Ajay Devgn, Anand Pandit and  Kumar Mangat, for which he started shooting in September 2019, streamed worldwide on 8 April 2021 on Disney+ Hotstar. The film received mixed reviews from critics, but praised the performance of Bachchan. He was then seen in Red Chillies Entertainment production's Bob Biswas, released in December 2021 on Zee5. In late 2021, Bachchan started shooting for the Hindi remake of R. Parthiban's national award-winning Tamil film Oththa Seruppu Size 7. The film is tentatively titled SSS-7 (Single Slipper Size – 7).

On 5 February 2022, he started filming for R Balki's Ghoomer.

Personal life and other work 

In October 2002, at his father Amitabh Bachchan's 60th birthday celebration, Abhishek and actress Karisma Kapoor announced their engagement. The engagement was called off in January 2003. Bachchan fell in love with Aishwarya Rai whilst filming for Dhoom 2, though both of them had already appeared together in Dhai Akshar Prem Ke (in which her then longtime boyfriend, Salman Khan, made a brief cameo) and Kuch Naa Kaho. Bachchan and Rai announced their engagement on 14 January 2007 which was later confirmed by his father, Amitabh Bachchan. The couple was married on 20 April 2007, according to traditional Hindu rituals of the Bunt community, to which Rai belongs. The wedding took place in a private ceremony at the Bachchan residence, Prateeksha, in Juhu, Mumbai, but was heavily covered by the entertainment media. The couple appeared on The Oprah Winfrey Show in September 2009, and were described as more famous than Brangelina. They have been described as a supercouple in the Indian media. Rai gave birth to a baby girl, Aaradhya, on 16 November 2011. Her daughter became quite popular by the name of "Beti B" which was named by the fans and the media, since the couple took over four months to name their daughter.

Bachchan bought the Pro Kabaddi League franchise team Jaipur Pink Panthers and co-purchased the Indian Super League football team Chennaiyin FC. in 2014. Jaipur Pink Panthers won the first ever championships held in 2014. Chennaiyin FC won the ISL 2015 and 2018. In 2005, he was a part of Tamil director Mani Ratnam's stage show, Netru, Indru, Naalai, an event which sought to raise funds for The Banyan, a voluntary organisation which rehabilitates homeless women with mental illness in Chennai. In the summer of 2008, Bachchan, his wife, his father, and actors Preity Zinta, Riteish Deshmukh, and Madhuri Dixit starred in the "Unforgettable World Tour" stage production. The first leg covered the US, Canada, Trinidad, and London. Bachchan is also involved in the functional and administrative operations of his father's company, originally known as ABCL, and renamed as AB Corp. Ltd. That company, along with Wizcraft International Entertainment Pvt. Ltd., developed the Unforgettable production. In 2011, Bachchan has promoted awareness of drug abuse in India as part of a citizen education campaign. The actor launched the Awareness Day race, which celebrated the silver jubilee of the country's Narcotics Control Bureau. His involvement in the kabaddi sport was documented in a 2020 television series, Sons of the Soil: Jaipur Pink Panthers.

Bachchan has been brand ambassador for products like LG Home appliances, American Express credit cards, Videocon DTH, Motorola mobiles, Ford Fiesta and Idea Cellular. Bachchan was announced the winner of the "Best Brand Ambassador of the Year" award at the NDTV Techlife Awards in 2009. AdEx India, a division of TAM Media Research conducted a study on celebrity brand endorsements for the period of Jan–Dec 2010 in which Abhishek Bachchan eats the pie with a 4.7% share ad volume out of the 41.5% film actors on the endorsement circuit. Bachchan became the brand ambassador for TTK Prestige, part of the TTK Group in October 2013 along with his wife Aishwarya Rai. In 2014, he became the brand ambassador for the END7 campaign of the Global Network for Neglected Tropical Diseases. The goal of the campaign is to eradicate seven different tropical diseases by 2020. On 11 July 2020, he tested positive for COVID-19, and was discharged on 8 August after testing negative.

Filmography

Awards 

For his roles in the films Yuva (2004), Sarkar (2005), and Kabhi Alvida Naa Kehna (2006), Bachchan won the Filmfare Award for Best Supporting Actor. He is the second and only actor after Dilip Kumar to win an acting award 3 consecutive times.

Discography

Singles 
Featured in
2005: "Right Here Right Now : Bluffmaster!" (Sunidhi Chauhan feat. Abhishek Bachchan)
2015: "Until the Sun Comes Up" (Raghav feat. Abhishek Bachchan & Nelly)

See also 

 List of Bollywood actors
 List of Indian film actors

References

External links 
 
 

1976 births
Living people
20th-century Bengalis
21st-century Bengalis
Indian male film actors
Male actors in Hindi cinema
Indian Hindus
Male actors from Mumbai
Filmfare Awards winners
Screen Awards winners
Film producers from Mumbai
Indian game show hosts
Mithibai College alumni
20th-century Indian male actors
21st-century Indian male actors
International Indian Film Academy Awards winners
Zee Cine Awards winners
Bachchan family
Actors with dyslexia
Alumni of Aiglon College